Ross Davies is a Welsh rugby union player. Davies was born in the village of Trinant near Newbridge, Caerphilly.

A prop forward, he joined Sale Sharks from Neath RFC in 2008 having previously gained honours for the Wales U18, U19 and 2005 Grand Slam winning U21 side.

During April 2009, Davies moved to Worcester Warriors for 3 months and in May 2009 he signed for the Ospreys. He was released by the Ospreys at the end of the 2009–10 season.

In April 2011 he became only the 2nd player from Trinant to play for the Barbarians when he was invited to play for the Club in the annual Mobbs Memorial match against Bedford Blues.

Ross played with Doncaster Knights from 2013 to 2015 after previously playing for local rivals Rotherham Titans.

From 2015 onwards he has mostly played in the USA intertwined with a Welsh Cup winning season at RGC in 2017 before 2 short 3 month stints with Cardiff and Pontypridd in the winters of 2018 and 2019. Stateside he has played for Dallas Rugby and then more recently became the first Welshman to play in the professional Major League Rugby (MLR) when he turned out for New Orleans Gold in 2019. He is currently taking a COVID enforced sabbatical from playing.

References

1984 births
Living people
Ospreys (rugby union) players
Rugby union players from Newbridge, Caerphilly
Rugby union players from Crumlin
Sale Sharks players
Welsh rugby union players
Worcester Warriors players
Rotherham Titans players
Doncaster Knights players
New Orleans Gold players
Rugby union props